Osman Çakmak (born 1977) is a Turkish football player and coach who is the manager of the Turkey national amputee football team. He played as midfielder and served as the captain of the national amputee team. Before his leg was amputated below the knee, he played professional football. In 2020, he was appointed manager of the national amputee football team which won the 2021 European Amputee Football Championship under his direction.

Private life
Osman Çakmak was the sixth and last child born in 1977 into a farm family in the village of Narlıkışla in the Zile district of Tokat Province, Turkey in 1977.

He was schooled in his village. After finishing primary school, he went to Istanbul with two of his brothers to look for work. Çakmak discontinued his education because of his passion for playing football. Despite his brothers' objections, he joined Zeytinburnuspor football club. Çakmak worked as a carpenter and supported his parents financially. He needed to earn more money to support his family when his brothers were conscripted, so he went to Russia as a foreign worker. Çakmak returned to Turkey and quit his football team's squad.

When he was conscripted, Çakmak chose the Commando unit and was stationed at the Iraq–Turkey border. In 1997, he stepped on an anti-personnel mine planted under a road's surface in Şenoba, Şırnak, southeastern Turkey, while he was on a road security detail, and lost his left leg below the knee.

In 2008, at the time of his therapy, while he was on his way to the military hospital in Ankara, Çakmak decided to play amputee football at the suggestion of his commanders.

In 2019, his parents were poisoned by gas leaking from a stove; his mother Sultan died, while his father was treated at an intensive care station.

Club player career

Association football
Çakmak played association football professionally in his youth for Zeytinburnuspor.

Amputee football
After his release from the military hospital, he joined the amputee football team, Karagücü, a Turkish Land Forces sports club, to play in the 2010–11 Turkish Amputee Football League.

International player career
In 2010, he was admitted to Turkey's national amputee team. He participated in the European and world championships in 2010, 2012 and 2014. The national team placed third among 24 nations. He captained the national team, which became champion of the 2017 European Amputee Football Championship and the runner-up of the 2018 Amputee Football World Cup.

Manager career
In 2020, he was appointed manager of the national amputee football team, which won the 2021 European Amputee Football Championship under his direction.

Honours

Player
 World Cup
 Runners-up (1): 2018

European Championship
 Winners (1): 2017

Manager
 World Cup
 Winners (1): 2022

European Championship
 Winners (1): 2021,

References

1977 births
Living people
People from Zile
Sportspeople from Tokat
Turkish footballers
Zeytinburnuspor footballers
Association football midfielders
Turkish expatriate sportspeople in Russia
Turkish amputee football players
Turkey international amputee football players
Turkish football managers